Alice Atherton (c. 1854 – February 4, 1899), was a dancer, comedian, actress, and theatrical performer during the late 19th century.

Early years

Born Alice Atherton Hogan to humble origins in Cincinnati; the daughter of William Hogan (1827–1907) and Sarah Bennett. Her family resided in Cincinnati (1860 census) with her Kentucky born father's profession being listed as a brush maker.

Atherton had a gift for impersonation from a young age. Her career began as a child actress, carried on as a baby in "The Sea of Ice", at the Robinson’s Opera House in her home city, Cincinnati. Some obituaries refer to her as having been born in St. Louis; her place of marriage.

Career
Atherton was discovered by Lydia Thompson, an English dancer, comedian, actress, and theatrical producer, who is recognized for introducing Victorian burlesque to the United States in August 1868, to great acclaim and notoriety.

Atherton was enrolled as one of her girls in "Ixion". This was Thompson's first U.S. show and it was a huge success. It included wit, parody, song, dance, spectacle, music, and it has since been said it even empowered women.

This launched her career and that of several actresses, including Lisa Weber, and Rose Coghlan.  It also drew fierce criticism from those who felt it transgressed the boundaries of propriety at the time. Burlesques, colloquially referred to as leg-shows, started off very tame, clever, and sophisticated, drawing in all types of people, especially women. Unfortunately, “the female audiences for burlesque did not last for long. In the summer of 1869 a wave of ‘anti-burlesque hysteria’ in the New York press frightened away the middle-class audiences that had initially been drawn to Ixion and sent the Thompson troupe prematurely packing on a tour around the United States and Canada.

Other shows followed, such as "Sinbad" and Atherton went on to become recognized as one of the best-natured, adventurous performers of the stage during the 1870s–1890s.

Atherton’s versatility as a performer became legendary, as a comic singer, a virtuoso whistler, and her "laughing song" became her signature piece. Though a parodist, she also excelled in comic roles that did not require playing a type.

Atherton meets Willie Edouin
 William Frederick Bryer  (1846-1908), who went by the stage name of Willie Edouin began a notable association with Lydia Thompson, playing with her burlesque troupe at Wood's Museum, New York, in October and November 1870. In the company was a sixteen-year-old Atherton. Three years later she married her English co-performer, Willie, on December 27, 1873, in St Louis. Together they became mainstays of the Coville burlesque companies. He organized the entertainment "Dreams, or Fun in the Photograph Gallery," a piece that showed off her skill for impersonation and popularized the comic skit as a stage form.

Atherton’s image on promotional picture cards
According to The Metropolitan Museum of Art, in NYC, which displays her cards, they were issued between 1880 and 1892 by Thomas H. Hall Tobacco, in order to promote stage actors between the acts as well as the brand called Bravo Cigarettes.

Move to England
Atherton moved to London with her English husband in 1883. There she would spend the majority of the final decade and a half of her career in music halls. During this period, Meyer Lutz, the German-born British composer and conductor who is best known for light music, musical theatre and burlesques of well-known works composed the popular song "Eyes of English Blue" for her.

In 1885 she took to the stage at the Prince's Theatre in Bristol and the Novelty Theatre in London, alongside Harriet Vernon, Lionel Brough and of course Willie Edouin in The Japs; or, The Doomed Daimio, a burlesque by Harry Paulton and Mostyn Teddea.

On February 25, 1888, her husband began his first managerial period at the Royal Strand Theatre, producing "Katti, the Family Help", with both of them playing the lead characters.

In 1894 she starred as Jane in Jaunty Jane Shore at the Royal Strand Theatre.

Return to New York
Atherton eventually returned to the American vaudeville stage in 1897.

Personal
Atherton had two daughters May and Daisy, and both took to the stage, and in honor of their mother they adopted the stage names of May Atherton (b. February 18, 1875) and Daisy Atherton
(b. September 30, 1876). Both were born in London, England. Daisy starred in The Torch-Bearers and other theatrical productions on Broadway. She also played roles in the first “talkies” during the 1920’s, known as Vitaphone Varieties.

Her sister Lavinia Hogan, also had a successful career on the stage both sides of the Atlantic, and was known as Venie Atherton, who continued her own career on stage until 1926.

Death
She died on February 4, 1899, at her apartment within the Hotel Audubon in New York City of pneumonia. The New York Times announced the location of the Church Service.

Her obituaries were extensive and on February 5, 1899, the Chicago Tribune marked her passing, describing her as an actress of merit:

The London Illustrated News reported on February 11, 1899:

The Times of India announced on March 1, 1899:

The Aberdeen Evening Express, marked her passing with a brief obituary on February 6, 1899:

Her body was taken to Evergreen Cemetery pending instructions from her husband who was in England at the time of her death. Her place of burial is unknown.

Legacy
Her portraits became highly collectible after her death. Many formed part of Frederick Hill Meserve's historical portrait collection, ca. 1850–1915 which were inherited by Dorothy Kunhardt. They have since been acquired by the National Portrait Gallery in Washington D.C.

See also
Rose Sydell - America’s first Burlesque Queen

External links

 photo gallery NYP Library

References

1854 births
1899 deaths
People from Cincinnati
American burlesque performers
American vedettes
American female dancers
19th-century American actresses
19th-century dancers
19th-century American women singers
19th-century American singers
American women comedians
American stage actresses
19th-century American women musicians